Cooper Morrison Carlisle (born August 11, 1977) is an American former college and professional football player who was a guard in the National Football League (NFL) for thirteen seasons.  Carlisle played college football for the University of Florida, where he was a member of a national championship team.  He was drafted in the fourth round of the 2000 NFL Draft by the Denver Broncos, and has played professionally for the Broncos and Oakland Raiders of the NFL.

Early life 

Carlisle was born in Greenville, Mississippi in 1977.  He attended McComb High School in McComb, Mississippi, and he played for the McComb Tigers high school football team.  Carlisle graduated from McComb in 1995 and, according to the Enterprise Journal, was the most sought-after college football recruit that year.  He was a first-team Mississippi all-state selection as a senior, and received high school All-America honors from Blue Chip Illustrated and USA Today.

College career 

Carlisle accepted an athletic scholarship to attend the University of Florida in Gainesville, Florida, where he played for coach Steve Spurrier's Florida Gators football team from 1996 to 1999.  The Gators coaching staff red-shirted Carlisle in 1995, but he was a letterman on the 1996 Gators' Bowl Alliance national championship team that defeated the Florida State Seminoles 52–20 in the Sugar Bowl.  As a senior in 1999, he was a team captain and a first-team All-Southeastern Conference (SEC) selection.

Carlisle was recognized as an SEC Academic Honor Roll honoree all four years, and graduated from Florida with a bachelor's degree in finance in 1999.

Professional career

Denver Broncos 

Oakland Raiders 

Carlisle signed with the Oakland Raiders as a restricted free agent on April 23, 2007 and remained a regular starter at right guard for the Raiders since the  season, replacing Kevin Boothe from the previous season.  From 2007 to 2011, Carlisle missed a start in only one game (in 2008).  During the  season, he helped the Raiders achieve their best record since 2002, playing between Samson Satele at center (15 games) and Langston Walker at right tackle (15 games).  During the  season, he started all sixteen regular season games.  The Raiders released him on March 14, 2012, but re-signed him five days later.

See also 

 Florida Gators football, 1990–99
 History of the Denver Broncos
 History of the Oakland Raiders
 List of Florida Gators in the NFL Draft
 List of University of Florida alumni

References

Bibliography 

 Carlson, Norm, University of Florida Football Vault: The History of the Florida Gators, Whitman Publishing, LLC, Atlanta, Georgia (2007).  .
 Golenbock, Peter, Go Gators!  An Oral History of Florida's Pursuit of Gridiron Glory, Legends Publishing, LLC, St. Petersburg, Florida (2002).  .
 Hairston, Jack, Tales from the Gator Swamp: A Collection of the Greatest Gator Stories Ever Told, Sports Publishing, LLC, Champaign, Illinois (2002).  .
 McCarthy, Kevin M.,  Fightin' Gators: A History of University of Florida Football, Arcadia Publishing, Mount Pleasant, South Carolina (2000).  .
 Nash, Noel, ed., The Gainesville Sun Presents The Greatest Moments in Florida Gators Football, Sports Publishing, Inc., Champaign, Illinois (1998).  .

External links 
  Cooper Carlisle – Florida Gators player profile
  Cooper Carlisle – Oakland Raiders player profile

1977 births
Living people
American football offensive guards
Denver Broncos players
Florida Gators football players
Oakland Raiders players
Sportspeople from Greenville, Mississippi
Players of American football from Mississippi